Marijke Zeekant (born 12 December 1956) is a Dutch rower. She competed in the women's quadruple sculls event at the 1988 Summer Olympics.

References

External links
 

1956 births
Living people
Dutch female rowers
Olympic rowers of the Netherlands
Rowers at the 1988 Summer Olympics
People from Medemblik
Sportspeople from North Holland
20th-century Dutch women
21st-century Dutch women